Brochfael ap Elisedd was a mid 8th century King of Powys, who inherited the throne from his father, Elisedd ap Gwylog. Upon his death, he was succeeded by his son, Cadell ap Brochfael. His name also was inscribed (as "Brochmail") in the Pillar of Eliseg.

References 

8th-century births
773 deaths
Monarchs of Powys
House of Gwertherion
8th-century Welsh monarchs